Magadan is a city in Russia.

Magadan may also refer to:
Magadan Oblast, a federal subject of Russia
Magadan (icebreaker), a Russian icebreaker
Dave Magadan, an American baseball player
Magadan, name used in some old Greek manuscripts to refer to the place in Palestine usually known as Magdala